is a junction passenger railway station located in the town of Miyashiro, Saitama, Japan, operated by the private railway operator Tōbu Railway.

Lines
The station is served by the Tōbu Skytree Line, and forms the starting point of the Tōbu Skytree Line, Tōbu Isesaki Line and the Tōbu Nikkō Line.

Station layout

The station has two island platforms serving four tracks, with an elevated station building located above the tracks and platforms. Track 1 does not exist, and platform numbering starts from Platform 2

Platforms

Adjacent stations

History
It was renamed on 16 March 1981 after the Tobu zoo and amusement park complex run by Tōbu, which is a ten-minute walk from the station. From 17 March 2012, station numbering was introduced on all Tōbu lines, with Tōbu-dōbutsu-kōen Station becoming "TS-30".

Passenger statistics
In fiscal 2019, the station was used by an average of 31,354 passengers daily.

Surrounding area
 Miyashiro Town Hall
 Sugito Post Office
 Nippon Institute of Technology
 Tobu Zoo

See also
 List of railway stations in Japan

References

External links

  

Railway stations in Saitama Prefecture
Railway stations in Japan opened in 1899
Tobu Skytree Line
Tobu Nikko Line
Tobu Isesaki Line
Stations of Tobu Railway
Miyashiro, Saitama